Paroemion is a form of alliteration where nearly every word in a sentence begins with the same consonant.

The repetition of initial consonant sounds in neighboring words (as wild and woolly, threatening throngs) is also called head rhyme or initial rhyme. 

An example of paroemion is:

References

Figures of speech